A ranking is a relationship between a set of items such that, for any two items, the first is either "ranked higher than", "ranked lower than" or "ranked equal to" the second.
In mathematics, this is known as a weak order or total preorder of objects. It is not necessarily a total order of objects because two different objects can have the same ranking. The rankings themselves are totally ordered. For example, materials are totally preordered by hardness, while degrees of hardness are totally ordered. If two items are the same in rank it is considered a tie.

By reducing detailed measures to a sequence of ordinal numbers, rankings make it possible to evaluate complex information according to certain criteria. Thus, for example, an Internet search engine may rank the pages it finds according to an estimation of their relevance, making it possible for the user quickly to select the pages they are likely to want to see.

Analysis of data obtained by ranking commonly requires non-parametric statistics.

Strategies for assigning rankings 
It is not always possible to assign rankings uniquely. For example, in a race or competition two (or more) entrants might tie for a place in the ranking. When computing an ordinal measurement, two (or more) of the quantities being ranked might measure equal. In these cases, one of the strategies shown below for assigning the rankings may be adopted. 
A common shorthand way to distinguish these ranking strategies is by the ranking numbers that would be produced for four items, with the first item ranked ahead of the second and third (which compare equal) which are both ranked ahead of the fourth. These names are also shown below.

Standard competition ranking ("1224" ranking) 
In competition ranking, items that compare equal receive the same ranking number, and then a gap is left in the ranking numbers. The number of ranking numbers that are left out in this gap is one less than the number of items that compared equal. Equivalently, each item's ranking number is 1 plus the number of items ranked above it. This ranking strategy is frequently adopted for competitions, as it means that if two (or more) competitors tie for a position in the ranking, the position of all those ranked below them is unaffected (i.e., a competitor only comes second if exactly one person scores better than them, third if exactly two people score better than them, fourth if exactly three people score better than them, etc.).

Thus if A ranks ahead of B and C (which compare equal) which are both ranked ahead of D, then A gets ranking number 1 ("first"), B gets ranking number 2 ("joint second"), C also gets ranking number 2 ("joint second") and D gets ranking number 4 ("fourth").

Modified competition ranking ("1334" ranking) 
Sometimes, competition ranking is done by leaving the gaps in the ranking numbers before the sets of equal-ranking items (rather than after them as in standard competition ranking). The number of ranking numbers that are left out in this gap remains one less than the number of items that compared equal. Equivalently, each item's ranking number is equal to the number of items ranked equal to it or above it. This ranking ensures that a competitor only comes second if they score higher than all but one of their opponents, third if they score higher than all but two of their opponents, etc.

Thus if A ranks ahead of B and C (which compare equal) which are both ranked ahead of D, then A gets ranking number 1 ("first"), B gets ranking number 3 ("joint third"), C also gets ranking number 3 ("joint third") and D gets ranking number 4 ("fourth"). In this case, nobody would get ranking number 2 ("second") and that would be left as a gap.

Dense ranking ("1223" ranking) 
In dense ranking, items that compare equally receive the same ranking number, and the next items receive the immediately following ranking number. Equivalently, each item's ranking number is 1 plus the number of items ranked above it that are distinct with respect to the ranking order.

Thus if A ranks ahead of B and C (which compare equal) which are both ranked ahead of D, then A gets ranking number 1 ("first"), B gets ranking number 2 ("joint second"), C also gets ranking number 2 ("joint second") and D gets ranking number 3 ("Third").

Ordinal ranking ("1234" ranking) 
In ordinal ranking, all items receive distinct ordinal numbers, including items that compare equal. The assignment of distinct ordinal numbers to items that compare equal can be done at random, or arbitrarily, but it is generally preferable to use a system that is arbitrary but consistent, as this gives stable results if the ranking is done multiple times. An example of an arbitrary but consistent system would be to incorporate other attributes into the ranking order (such as alphabetical ordering of the competitor's name) to ensure that no two items exactly match.

With this strategy, if A ranks ahead of B and C (which compare equal) which are both ranked ahead of D, then A gets ranking number 1 ("first") and D gets ranking number 4 ("fourth"), and either B gets ranking number 2 ("second") and C gets ranking number 3 ("third") or C gets ranking number 2 ("second") and B gets ranking number 3 ("third").

In computer data processing, ordinal ranking is also referred to as "row numbering".

Fractional ranking ("1 2.5 2.5 4" ranking) 
Items that compare equal receive the same ranking number, which is the mean of what they would have under ordinal rankings; equivalently, the ranking number of 1 plus the number of items ranked above it plus half the number of items equal to it. This strategy has the property that the sum of the ranking numbers is the same as under ordinal ranking. For this reason, it is used in computing Borda counts and in statistical tests (see below).

Thus if A ranks ahead of B and C (which compare equal) which are both ranked ahead of D, then A gets ranking number 1 ("first"), B and C each get ranking number 2.5 (average of "joint second/third") and D gets ranking number 4 ("fourth").

Here is an example: 
Suppose you have the data set 1.0, 1.0, 2.0, 3.0, 3.0, 4.0, 5.0, 5.0, 5.0.

The ordinal ranks are 1, 2, 3, 4, 5, 6, 7, 8, 9.

For v = 1.0, the fractional rank is the average of the ordinal ranks: (1 + 2) / 2 = 1.5.
In a similar manner, for v = 5.0, the fractional rank is (7 + 8 + 9) / 3 = 8.0.

Thus the fractional ranks are: 1.5, 1.5, 3.0, 4.5, 4.5, 6.0, 8.0, 8.0, 8.0

Ranking in statistics 
In statistics, ranking is the data transformation in which numerical or ordinal values are replaced by their rank when the data are sorted. For example, the numerical data 3.4, 5.1, 2.6, 7.3 are observed, the ranks of these data items would be 2, 3, 1 and 4 respectively. For example, the ordinal data hot, cold, warm would be replaced by 3, 1, 2. In these examples, the ranks are assigned to values in ascending order. (In some other cases, descending ranks are used.) Ranks are related to the indexed list of order statistics, which consists of the original dataset rearranged into ascending order.

Some kinds of statistical tests employ calculations based on ranks. Examples include:

 Friedman test
 Kruskal–Wallis test
 Rank products
 Spearman's rank correlation coefficient
 Wilcoxon rank-sum test
 Wilcoxon signed-rank test
 Van der Waerden test

The distribution of values in decreasing order of rank is often of interest when values vary widely in scale; this is the rank-size distribution (or rank-frequency distribution), for example for city sizes or word frequencies. These often follow a power law.

Some ranks can have non-integer values for tied data values. For example, when there is an even number of copies of the same data value, the above described fractional statistical rank of the tied data ends in ½.
Percentile rank is another type of statistical ranking.

Rank function in Excel 
Microsoft Excel provides two ranking functions, the Rank.EQ function which assigns competition ranks ("1224") and the Rank.AVG function which assigns fractional ranks ("1 2.5 2.5 4") as described above. The functions have the order argument, which is by default is set to descending, i.e. the largest number will have a rank 1. This is generally uncommon for statistics where the ranking is usually in ascending order, where the smallest number has a rank 1.

Comparison of rankings 
A rank correlation can be used to compare two rankings for the same set of objects. 
For example, Spearman's rank correlation coefficient is useful to measure the statistical dependence between the rankings of athletes in two tournaments. And the Kendall rank correlation coefficient is another approach. 
Alternatively, intersection/overlap-based approaches offer additional flexibility. 
One example is the "Rank–rank hypergeometric overlap" approach, which is designed to compare ranking of the genes that are at the "top" of two ordered lists of differentially expressed genes. 
A similar approach is taken by the "Rank Biased Overlap (RBO)", which also implements an adjustable probability, p, to customize the weight assigned at a desired depth of ranking. 
These approaches have the advantages of addressing disjoint sets, sets of different sizes, and top-weightedness (taking into account the absolute ranking position, which may be ignored in standard non-weighted rank correlation approaches).

Definition 
This definition is due to Vaart, Chapter 13 
Let  be a set of random variables. By sorting them into order, we have defined their order statistics

If all the values are unique, the rank of variable number  is the unique solution  to the equation .

Applications

Ranking and socioeconomic evaluation 
The rank methodology based on some specific indices is one of the most common systems used by policy makers and international organizations in order to assess the socio-economic context of the countries. Some notable examples are: Human Development Index (United Nations), Doing Business Index (World Bank), Corruption Perceptions Index (Transparency International) and  Index of Economic Freedom (the Heritage Foundation).
For instance, the Doing Business Indicator of the World Bank measures business regulations and their enforcement in 190 countries. Countries are ranked according to 10 indicators that are synthesized to produce the final rank. Each indicator is composed of sub-indicators; for instance, the Registering Property Indicator is composed of 4 sub-indicators measuring time, procedures, costs and quality of the land registration system. Obviously, these kinds of ranks are based on subjective criteria for assigning the score. Sometimes, the adopted parameters may produce discrepancies with the empirical observations, therefore potential biases and paradox may emerge from the application of these criteria.

Ranking as a social game 

Being competitive is the very nature of human beings. The desire to achieve a higher social rank can be perceived as a driving force for human beings. In simple terms, we want to know who is the richest, the cleverest, the most handsome or prettiest. We are also sometimes ranked by others: our supervisors, our neighbors, and compare our status in society with that of the others. An inevitable question is how objective or subjective these rankings are? Many ranked lists are based on subjective categorization. We can even pose the question: do we always want to be seen objectively, or rather do not mind having a better image than we deserve? There are certainly specific difficulties in measuring society. In order to find our place in real and virtual communities we need to understand the issues emerging when navigating between objectivity and subjectivity by combining human and artificial intelligence. The set of subjects to treat this topics include comparison, ranking, rating, choices, laws, ranking games, struggle for reputation, etc (see Péter Érdi).

Other examples 

 In politics, rankings focus on the comparison of economic, social, environmental and governance performance of countries, see List of international rankings.
 In many sports, individuals or teams are given rankings, generally by the sport's governing body.
 In association football (soccer), national teams are ranked in the FIFA World Rankings, the Women's World Rankings and, unofficially, in the World Football Elo Ratings.
 In the Olympic Games, each member country (NOC) is ranked based upon gold, silver and bronze medal counts in the Olympic medal rankings.
 In basketball, national teams are ranked in the FIBA World Rankings and the Women's World Rankings.
 In baseball and softball, national teams are ranked in the WBSC World Rankings.
 In ice hockey, national teams are ranked in the IIHF World Ranking.
 In golf, the top male golfers are ranked using the Official World Golf Rankings, and the top female golfers are ranked using the Women's World Golf Rankings.
 In snooker, players are ranked using the Snooker world rankings.
 In tennis, male and female players are ranked using the ATP rankings and WTA rankings respectively, whilst the ITF rankings are used for national Davis Cup and Fed Cup teams.
 In road bicycle racing, male cyclists have been ranked using the UCI World Ranking from 2016, having previously been ranked using the UCI Road World Rankings from 1984 to 2004. Female cyclists have been ranked using the UCI Women's Road World Rankings since 1994.
 In track cycling riders and nations are ranked using the UCI Track Cycling World Ranking
 In chess, players are ranked using the FIDE world rankings.
 In sailing, boats are scored directly using the sum of the ranking.
 In bridge, matchpoint scoring uses fractional ranking to assign the score.
 In relation to credit standing, the ranking of a security refers to where that particular security would stand in a wind up of the issuing company, i.e., its seniority in the company's capital structure. For instance, capital notes are subordinated securities; they would rank behind senior debt in a wind up. In other words, the holders of senior debt would be paid out before subordinated debt holders received any funds.
 Search engines rank web pages by their expected relevance to a user's query using a combination of query-dependent and query-independent methods. Query-independent methods attempt to measure the estimated importance of a page, independent of any consideration of how well it matches the specific query. Query-independent ranking is usually based on link analysis; examples include the HITS algorithm, PageRank and TrustRank. Query-dependent methods attempt to measure the degree to which a page matches a specific query, independent of the importance of the page. Query-dependent ranking is usually based on heuristics that consider the number and locations of matches of the various query words on the page itself, in the URL or in any anchor text referring to the page.
 In Webometrics it is possible to rank institutions according to their presence in the web (number of webpages) and the impact of these contents (external inlinks=site citations), such as the Webometrics Ranking of World Universities
 In video gaming, players may be given a ranking. To "rank up" is to achieve a higher ranking relative to other players, especially with strategies that do not depend on the player's skill.
 The TrueSkill ranking system is a skill based ranking system for Xbox Live developed at Microsoft Research
 A bibliogram ranks common noun phrases in a piece of text.
 In language, the status of an item (usually through what is known as "downranking" or "rank-shifting") in relation to the uppermost rank in a clause; for example, in the sentence "I want to eat the cake you made today", "eat" is on the uppermost rank, but "made" is downranked as part of the nominal group "the cake you made today"; this nominal group behaves as though it were a single noun (i.e., I want to eat it), and thus the verb within it ("made") is ranked differently from "eat".
 Academic journals are sometimes ranked according to impact factor; the number of later articles that cite articles in a given journal.

See also
 League table
 Ordinal data
 Percentile rank
 Rating (disambiguation)

References

External links

RANKNUM, a Matlab function to compute the five types of ranks
Matlab Toolbox with functions to compute ranks
 TrueSkill Ranking System
 Ranking Library written in Ruby
 List of Global Development Indexes and Rankings

Nonparametric statistics
 
Comparison (mathematical)